Geikie is a locality in Alberta, Canada.

The locality takes its name from Mount Geikie.

References 

Localities in Jasper, Alberta